Massachusetts has several forms of direct democracy, allowing for initiative and referendums at the state level and in many municipalities. The recall of public officials is also provided for in many municipalities.

History 

The progressive movement started discussions about adopting direct democracy across the United States, and Massachusetts developed a local branch. The state branch of the Populist Party adopted the statewide initiative and referendum in its 1895 platform. State representative Henry Stirling proposed some of the first legislation for direct democracy in 1900. It was eventually enacted in 1917 at the state constitutional convention.

State government

Initiatives 
The state allows an indirect form of initiative for laws and constitutional amendments, and the state is considered one of the most restrictive of the states that allow initiatives.

Excluded subjects 
Initiatives must be confined to one subject and cannot relate to judges and courts, relate only to specific municipalities of the state, relate to religion, make specific appropriations of money, or restrict the Declaration of Rights in the state constitution. The Office of the Attorney General of Massachusetts may do an informal review to ensure it passes these requirements.

Free petition 

Massachusetts has a unique form of direct democracy in the free petition. This allows any person or group to file a bill in the state legislature, which are treated equally as a bill filed by a representative. The petition must be considered by the legislature and are submitted to a committee for public discussion, and may be voted on and enacted like any other piece of legislation. 

In practice, this form of direct democracy is rarely successful in enacted new laws. In the 2015-2016 session there were at least 177 bills filed by private individuals in the state, with only four leaving committee for a floor vote and none being enacted. 

Massachusetts is the only state in the country to allow citizens to file bills directly into the legislature.

Advisory questions 
The General Court may put a non binding public policy question on the ballot, and constituents may also hold a nonbinding vote to instruct a representative in the legislature how they should vote on laws. The General Court may also put amendments to the US constitution on the ballot, but they are only advisory

List of referendums

1631-1779

2000- 
 2002 Massachusetts ballot measures
 2004 Massachusetts ballot measures
 2006 Massachusetts ballot measures
 2008 Massachusetts ballot measures
 2010 Massachusetts ballot measures
 2012 Massachusetts ballot measures
 2014 Massachusetts ballot measures
 2016 Massachusetts ballot measures
 2018 Massachusetts ballot measures
 2020 Massachusetts ballot measures

See also 
 Elections in Massachusetts
 Direct Democracy
 Initiatives and referendums in the United States

References

Further reading
 

Direct democracy
Massachusetts ballot measures
Politics of Massachusetts